The All-Ireland Senior B Hurling Championship of 1995 was the 22nd staging of Ireland's secondary hurling knock-out competition.  London won the championship, beating Wicklow 2-7 to 0-8 in the final at O'Moore Park, Portlaoise.

References

 Donegan, Des, The Complete Handbook of Gaelic Games (DBA Publications Limited, 2005).

1995
B